Pathika or Patikka is in Muzaffarabad, Pakistan.

Muzaffarabad